The  was a cabinet-level ministry in the final days of the Empire of Japan, charged with the procurement and manufacture of armaments, spare parts and munitions to support the Japanese war effort in World War II.

History
The Ministry of Munitions was created on 1 November 1943  out of the Board of Planning of the Ministry of Commerce and Industry, which was subsequently abolished. With an increasing portion of Japan's industrial base and infrastructure damaged by Allied air raids, the Japanese government felt it necessary to unify the administration of munitions production to improve efficiency and to increase production levels, particularly that of military aircraft. The concept was inspired by the German Ministry of Armaments and Munitions under  Fritz Todt and Albert Speer, which had successfully increased Nazi Germany's industrial production under similar adverse conditions, and was also an unsuccessful political move by the military to impose more control over the zaibatsu.

Although Prime Minister Tōjō concurrently was first Minister of Munitions, the actual day-to-day running of the Ministry devolved to his deputy, Nobusuke Kishi.

Key firms were designated as components of the nationalized Munitions Companies System, and managers were given positions as government officials. Production staff was regarded as conscript labor and was not allowed to quit, or go on strike.  State-controlled financial institutions provided working capital and subsidized the firms for any losses.

The Ministry of Munitions was abolished in 1945, by the American occupation authorities, and its functions were absorbed into the modern Ministry of International Trade and Industry (MITI).

Organization
Munitions Minister
Secretariat
General Operations Bureau
Aircraft Production Bureau
Mechanical Bureau
Iron & Steel Bureau
Light Metals Bureau
Non-Metallic Materials Bureau
Chemical Bureau
Fuels Bureau
Electricity Bureau

List of Ministers

References

Books

External links

Notes 

Military history of Japan during World War II
Former government ministries of Japan
Politics of the Empire of Japan
1943 establishments in Japan
1945 disestablishments in Japan